Bezirk Bruck an der Leitha is a district of the state of Lower Austria in Austria.

Municipalities

Towns are indicated in boldface; market towns (Marktgemeinden) in italics; suburbs, hamlets and other subdivisions of a municipality are indicated by lower dots.
 Au am Leithaberge
 Bad Deutsch-Altenburg
 Berg
 Bruck an der Leitha
 Bruck an der Leitha, Wilfleinsdorf, Schloss Prugg
 Ebergassing
 Ebergassing, Wienerherberg
 Enzersdorf an der Fischa
 Enzersdorf an der Fischa, Margarethen am Moos
 Fischamend
 Fischamend-Dorf, Fischamend-Markt
 Göttlesbrunn-Arbesthal
 Arbesthal, Göttlesbrunn
 Götzendorf an der Leitha
 Götzendorf an der Leitha, Pischelsdorf
 Gramatneusiedl
  Hainburg an der Donau
 Haslau-Maria Ellend
 Haslau an der Donau, Maria Ellend
 Himberg
 Himberg, Velm, Pellendorf, Gutenhof
 Hof am Leithaberge
 Höflein
 Hundsheim
 Klein-Neusiedl
 Lanzendorf
 Leopoldsdorf
 Mannersdorf am Leithagebirge
 Mannersdorf am Leithagebirge, Wasenbruck
 Maria Lanzendorf
 Moosbrunn
 Petronell-Carnuntum
 Prellenkirchen
 Deutsch-Haslau, Prellenkirchen, Schönabrunn
 Rauchenwarth
 Rohrau
 Gerhaus, Hollern, Pachfurth, Rohrau
 Scharndorf
 Regelsbrunn, Scharndorf, Wildungsmauer
 Schwadorf
 Schwechat
 Kledering, Mannswörth, Rannersdorf, Schwechat
 Sommerein
 Trautmannsdorf an der Leitha
 Gallbrunn, Sarasdorf, Stixneusiedl, Trautmannsdorf an der Leitha
 Wolfsthal
 Zwölfaxing

Changes
In 2017 the district annexed Ebergassing, Fischamend, Gramatneusiedl, Himberg, Klein-Neusiedl, Lanzendorf, Leopoldsdorf, Maria Lanzendorf, Moosbrunn, Rauchenwarth, Schwadorf, Schwechat and Zwölfaxing from the dissolved Wien-Umgebung District.

See also
 Leithagebirge
 Leitha (River)
 Neusiedl am See District
 Eisenstadt-Umgebung District

References

 
Districts of Lower Austria